Hamer Hill is a hill  high on the eastern edge of the central mountain mass of Sobral Peninsula, Nordenskjöld Coast, Graham Land, Antarctica. It was named by the UK Antarctic Place-Names Committee for Richard D. Hamer, a British Antarctic Survey geologist at Rothera Station, 1978–79 and 1980–81, who worked in the area.

References

Hills of Graham Land
Nordenskjöld Coast